Arckanum was a Swedish black metal solo band formed in 1993 by Johan "Shamaatae" Lahger, who was the only constant member. Arckanum ranks among the most influential and popular in the Swedish black metal scene.

Shamaatae is also an author of occult literature and writes under the names Vexior/Ekortu. His first published work, titled Panparadox, was released 13 July 2009 by Ixaxaar. His second book, was released in December 2010 by Fall of Man. His third book was published on December, 21st 2014 called , it is said to be a "book series" with each book dedicated to the Thursatru tradition. As of 2018, he has published multiple books and has many more to come. He put the band to rest in favour of being a writer.

History 
Shamaatae joined his first band, Conquest, aged eleven, the band later evolving into Grotesque. On leaving Grotesque, Shamaatae formed a technical death metal band called Disinterment, who recorded one demo and played a few gigs before splitting up. At the end of 1992, Shamaatae decided to return to black metal and Arckanum was started. Initially a full band, it became a solo project after six months. After several releases, by 1998 Shamaatae had discontinued working with Necropolis Records because they went under, and turned his attention to writing books on the subjects of Pan, Old Norse traditions, runic witchcraft and anti-cosmic Satanism/chaos-gnosticism.

He was still involved in music during this time still working with Arckanum and playing drums with The Hearsemen. Arckanum's album ÞÞÞÞÞÞÞÞÞÞÞ was released on 1  June 2009. Antikosmos and ÞÞÞÞÞÞÞÞÞÞÞ featured the guest appearance of Set Teitan of the bands Dissection and Watain. Shamataae released 3 more full lengths and several EPs and splits before deciding to record Arckanum's final album  which was released on 29 September 2017 through Folter Records, who are currently re-releasing the band's entire catalogue.

Arckanum was split up in 2018 in order for Shamaatae to focus solely on his authorship and spiritual ventures.
On 26 April 2019, Folter Records released , an EP which contains the remixed and remastered recordings that were supposed to be the 1994 demo ; Shamaatae was unhappy with the original recordings and kept the material unreleased until after he disbanded Arckanum.

Lyrics 
Arckanum's lyrics deal mainly with the worship of Chaos, as well as anti-cosmic Satanism. He is noted for writing lyrics resembling Old Swedish, and he has stated that he tries to write his lyrics as grammatically correct as he can. In his latest three albums however, the language is clearly meant to resemble Old East Norse.

Discography

Albums 
 Fran marder (15 May 1995) Necropolis
 Kostogher (20 February 1997) Necropolis
 Kampen (1998) Necropolis
 Antikosmos (21 June 2008) Debemur Morti/Moribund
 ÞÞÞÞÞÞÞÞÞÞÞ (29 May 2009) Debemur Morti
 Sviga læ (18 October 2010) Regain Records
 Helvítismyrkr (16 September 2011) Season of Mist
 Fenris Kindir (10 May 2013) Season of Mist
 Den förstfödde (29 September 2017) Folter Records

Demos 
 Demo '93 (1993)
 Trulen (1994)

EPs 
 Boka vm Kaos (Feb. 2002)
 Kosmos wardhin dræpas om sin / Emptiness Enthralls (Feb. 2003) (split release with Contamino)
 Kaos svarta mar / Skinning the Lambs (14 June 2004) Carnal (split release with Svartsyn)
 Grimalkinz skaldi (13 June 2008)
 Antikosmos (11 April 2008)
 Hadelik (7 September 2008) (split release with Sataros Grief)
 Þyrmir (30 October 2009)
 Första trulen (26 April 2019)

Compilations 
 Arckanum – The 11 Year Anniversary Album (2004)

References

External links 
 Official website (archive)
 

Swedish black metal musical groups
Musical groups established in 1993
1993 establishments in Sweden
One-man bands
Season of Mist artists